Running Home to You is the debut studio album by Swedish boyband Youngblood released through EMI Sweden. Two singles were released from the album prior, "Blame It On You" and their Melodifestivalen 2012 entry "Youngblood".

Track list
"Youngblood (3:04)
"American Girlfriend" (3:09)
"Tenderly" (4:09)
"Play My Song" (3:39)
"Blame It On You" (3:11)
"Running Home to You" (4:00)
"Sleep On It" (4:03)
"Outside Boy" (3:54)
"Youngblood" (Instrumental) (3:07)

Charts

Weekly charts

Year-end charts

References

2012 debut albums
Youngblood (band) albums